The 1986–87 Rugby League Divisional Premiership  was the 1st end-of-season Rugby League Divisional Premiership competition.

The competition was contested by the top eight teams in the second Division. The winners were Swinton.

First round

Semi-finals

Final

See also
 1986–87 Rugby Football League season

Notes

References
 

Rugby League Divisional Premiership